The year 1764 in architecture involved some significant events.

Events
 Robert Adam's Ruins of the Palace of the Emperor Diocletian at Spalatro in Dalmatia published.
 Heidelberg Castle (Holy Roman Empire, Germany) is again burned and destroyed by a thunderbolt.

Buildings and structures

Buildings
 Exeter Synagogue (England) is dedicated.
 New All Saints Church, Nuneham Courtenay, Oxfordshire, England, designed by Simon Harcourt, 1st Earl Harcourt, with James "Athenian" Stuart, is built.
 Church of St. Stephen, Borovo in Serbia is completed.
 Iglesia Mayor de San Pedro y San Pablo in San Fernando, Cádiz, is consecrated.
 Bell tower of Church of Nuestra Señora de la Asunción (Valdemoro) in Spain is completed.
 Saint John the Baptist Church, Târgu Mureș in the Habsburg Empire, designed by Jesuit Valentin Scherzer, is built.
 Church of the Intercession at Kizhi Pogost in Karelia is rebuilt.
 Harmandir Sahib in Amritsar, Punjab, is rebuilt.
 Custom House, Lancaster, England is designed by Richard Gillow in the Palladian style.
 Holkham Hall, England, is completed in the Palladian style by William Kent after thirty years of building work.
 The Yellow Palace, Copenhagen, is completed by Nicolas-Henri Jardin for the timber merchant H. F. Bargum. It later becomes a residence of the Danish royal family.
 Château du Prada in France, designed by Victor Louis, is built.
 The Chinese House in Sanssouci Park, Potsdam (Prussia), designed by Johann Gottfried Büring, is completed.
 Jade Belt Bridge in grounds of Summer Palace, Beijing (Qing dynasty China) is completed.
 Sandy Hook Light, New Jersey, is designed and built by Isaac Conro.
 Construction work begins on the Theatre Royal, Bristol, England, designed by James Paty.
 Remodelling of Łazienki Palace in Warsaw by Domenico Merlini is begun (completed 1795).

Births
May 1 – Benjamin Latrobe, British-born American neoclassical architect best known for the United States Capitol (died 1820)
July 9 – Louis-Pierre Baltard, French architect and engraver (died 1846)
August 22 – Charles Percier, French neoclassical architect, interior decorator and designer (died 1838)

Deaths
August 7 – James Burrough, English academic, antiquary and amateur architect (born 1691)
Unknown – Giovanni Antonio Scalfarotto, Venetian architect (born c.1700)

References

Architecture
Years in architecture
18th-century architecture